Bazhong is a prefecture-level city in north-eastern Sichuan province, China. Its population was 2,712,894 at the 2020 census whom 1,064,766 lived in Bazhou and Enyang urban districts.

History
Bazhong became a prefecture-level city in 1993. Its history goes back further; during the Xia and Shang dynasties, it was purportedly a vassal territory of Liang State. In the Spring and Autumn period, it was called Bazi. In the Qin and Western Han dynasties it was called Ba County. In the Eastern Han Dynasty, around the year 100 CE, this was changed to Hanchang County. One hundred years later it reverted to Baxi County. Since then it has usually either been called Liang County or Yi County.

In ancient times, it was the land of the Ba Kingdom, and after the Qin Kingdom destroyed the Ba Kingdom, the Ba County was established. The Western Han Dynasty belongs to Dangqu County, Ba County. In the third year of Yongyuan in the Eastern Han Dynasty (91 years), Hanchang County was located in the north of Dangqu County, and it was governed by the urban area of ​​Bazhou today. In the sixth year of Jian'an (201), Berkshire was renamed Brazil County. During the period from Shu Han to the Northern and Southern Dynasties, Dangqu County was repeatedly established, and Hanchang County belonged to it. In the first year of the Northern Wei Dynasty (504), Dagu County was established in Hanchang County. In the third year of Yanchang (514), Bazhou was established, named after the country of Cuba. In the second year of Xiping (517), Bazhou was moved to Hanchang County. In the sixth year (525) of Liangtong in the Southern Dynasties, Liangguang County was established in Hanchang County, and it was the county seat of Dagu County in Bazhou. In the second year of the elephant in the Northern Zhou Dynasty (580), it was transformed into a county.

In the third year of Sui Daye (607), Bazhou was abolished, Qinghua County was established, and Chenghua County was governed. In the first year of Tang Wude (618), Qinghua County was changed to Bazhou. In the first year of Zhenguan (627), Bazhou belonged to Shannan Road. In the 21st year of Kaiyuan (733 years), it belongs to Shannan West Road. In the Song Dynasty, Bazhou belonged to Lizhou Road. Yuan Dynasty belongs to Guangyuan Road. In the ninth year of Ming Hongwu (1376), Huacheng County entered Bazhou, and Bazhou was reduced to Ba County. In the ninth year of Zhengde (1514), Bazhou was restored and belonged to Baoning. Qing Dynasty because of Ming system.

In the second year of the Republic of China (1913), Bazhou was changed to Bazhong County, belonging to North Sichuan Road, and the following year to Jialing Road. 1928 Abolition system. From 1933 to 1935, the Fourth Front Army of the Chinese Workers' and Peasants' Red Army established the Soviet government here in Bazhong County, Sichuan-Shaanxi Province. In the 24th year of the Republic of China (1935), Bazhong County belonged to the 15th Administrative Inspectorate District of Sichuan Province.

After the founding of the People's Republic of China, Bazhong County belongs to the Daxian District of the North Sichuan Administration District. In 1952, Daxian Prefecture was directly led by Sichuan Province. In 1968, the Daxian area was renamed Daxian area. In July 1993, Bazhong County was revoked and Bazhong City was established at the county level; Bazhong District was established by Daxian District, and the Administrative Office was stationed in Bazhong City, and Tongjiang, Nanjiang, and Pyeongchang counties were placed under Bazhong District. On June 14, 2000, the Bazhong area was revoked, and the prefecture-level Bazhong City was established. The original county-level Bazhong City was changed to Bazhou District. On January 18, 2013, Enyang District was established by Bazhou District.

Geography and climate
Bazhong is located at the southern end of the Daba Mountains, and borders Shaanxi province to the north, Dazhou to the east, Nanchong to the south, and Guangyuan to the west.

Bazhong has a monsoon-influenced humid subtropical climate (Köppen Cwa) which is largely mild and humid, with four distinct seasons. Winter is short, mild, and foggy, though actual precipitation is low. January averages , and while frost may occur, snow is rare. Summers are long, hot and humid, with temperatures often reaching . Spring is warm and temperatures rise quickly but unstably, and hail is common. Rainfall is light in winter and can be heavy in summer, and more than 70% of the annual total occurs between May and September. The annual frost-free period lasts between 260 and 280 days.

Administration
Bazhong has 2 cities, 3 counties, 188 township, and 2,354 villages. The population was 3,284,000 in 2013, with 1,127,000 of that urban.

Transportation 
The Guangyuan–Bazhong railway and Bazhong–Dazhou railway pass through the city. There are passenger stations at Bazhong and Pingchang.

Economy
The city's GDP accounts for approximately 1.9% of Sichuan's total GDP and ranks nineteenth in the province.
In 2017, Bazhong's GDP reached RMB 60.1 billion, representing a rise of 8.1%.

The city is served by Bazhong Enyang Airport which opened in February 2019.

See also 
 Nankan Grottoes, a tourist attraction south of the city

References

External links
 Official Website (Chinese)

 
Cities in Sichuan
Prefecture-level divisions of Sichuan